Yellowbank Creek is a stream in Georgia, and is a tributary of the Soque River.

Course
 

Yellowbank Creek rises in central Habersham County, Georgia, just north of Harvest, and approximately 2 miles northwest of the intersection of State Route 17 and State Route 115, and runs directly south for approximately 4 miles, first crossing State Route 17, then State Route 115 in the process, and picking up the waters of a couple of unnamed branches. Just south of State Route 115, the creek turns sharply eastward, then turns back south at its meeting with an unnamed creek that rises and runs parallel to Yellowbank Creek, before flowing into the Soque River just east of where the Soque crosses State Route 105.

Sub-watershed details
The creek watershed and associated waters is designated by the United States Geological Survey as sub-watershed HUC 031300010206, is named the Lower Soque River sub-watershed, and drains an area of approximately 15 square miles west of Clarkesville and northwest of Demorest, as well as northwest of the Soque River.

See also
 Water Resource Region
 South Atlantic-Gulf Water Resource Region
 Apalachicola basin

References

External links
Soque River Watershed Association

Yellowbank Creek (Soque River)
Rivers of Habersham County, Georgia